Toys is a 1992 American fantasy comedy film directed by Barry Levinson, co-written by Levinson and Valerie Curtin, and starring Robin Williams, Michael Gambon, Joan Cusack, Robin Wright, LL Cool J, and Jamie Foxx in his feature film debut. Released in December 1992 in the United States, and March and April 1993 in the United Kingdom and Australia, respectively, the film was produced by Levinson's production company Baltimore Pictures and distributed by 20th Century Fox. Despite appearing somewhat juvenile at first glance, the film received a PG-13 rating from the MPAA for some language and sensuality.

The film was a box-office failure at the time of its release, despite its cast and filmmaking. Director Barry Levinson was nominated for a Razzie Award for Worst Director (losing to David Seltzer for Shining Through). The film did, however, receive Oscar nominations for Art Direction (losing to Howards End) and Costume Design (losing to Bram Stoker's Dracula). It was also entered into the 43rd Berlin International Film Festival.

Plot
Kenneth Zevo, owner of Zevo Toys in Moscow, Idaho, is dying. He surprises his assistant, Owen Owens, by announcing that instead of his son Leslie succeeding him, his younger brother, U.S. Army Lieutenant General Leland Zevo, will do so. Even Leland, whose relationship with Kenneth is strained, is surprised, noting how Leslie has been apprenticed at the toy factory most of his life. Kenneth agrees Leslie loves toys and his work, but his childlike demeanor would jeopardize the company. Kenneth had even hired Gwen Tyler to work in the factory, hoping she and Leslie would start a relationship to help Leslie mature. Leland reluctantly takes control after Kenneth's death, and since Leslie and his sister Alsatia know about toymaking, he first decides to effectively give them control of the factory. However, Leland's interest is piqued upon hearing about corporate secrets potentially being leaked, and he hires his son, Patrick, a soldier with covert military expertise, to manage security. From Patrick, Leland is inspired to build war toys, even though Leslie explains that Zevo Toys has never made war toys due to Kenneth's overall dislike of war, which caused the strained relationship with his brother. Meanwhile, Leslie finally notices Gwen, and they start dating.

One night, Leland and Patrick go into town, where they peruse a video arcade, watching children play intently at the flickering game consoles. Going to a local toy store, Leland is amazed at what other companies have produced regarding war toys. As they drive back to the countryside, Leland and Patrick stop at a small pond, and Leland soon realizes that if military aircraft and hardware could be shrunken down and operated by remote control, military spending could become less cumbersome.

Leland offers to drop the idea of Zevo Toys making war toys, but asks Leslie if he can partition off a small amount of the factory to develop toys of his own. He asks Leslie to avoid the area, fearing that his toys may not be good enough. Unknown to Leslie, Leland is using the space to develop miniature remotely controlled war machines, aspiring to sell these to the military. However, military leaders refuse to buy into his plan, and Leland, becoming unhinged by their refusal, moves ahead with his plan independently. He increasingly takes over the factory's space and increases security, shrinking other departments and shutting down Alsatia's, effectively laying off numerous workers. When Leslie sees children being led into a restricted area, he sneaks in and discovers Leland training children to operate the miniature war machines with arcade-like interfaces. Leslie barely escapes the "Sea Swine" amphibious drone guarding an exit, and flees to Gwen's house to reveal his findings. Unbeknownst to him, Leland, aware of Leslie's discovery, prepares to defend his parts of the factory, promoting himself to general of his own army. Patrick learns Leland lied about his mother's death and quits to warn Leslie.

Leslie, Alsatia, Patrick, Gwen and Owen infiltrate the factory and then disperse to locate the main control center. Leland takes the opportunity to unleash some cute-yet-deadly toys, before setting his military-style "Tommy Tanks" and "Hurly-Burly Helicopters" on them. Leslie, Alsatia, Gwen and Owen end up finding their way into a storage warehouse, where he had the older Zevo Toys stored. Devising a plan, Leslie winds up the old toys and puts them to battle against Leland's war machines. He then manages to get to Leland, and during a fight, Leland's helicopter attempts to hit Leslie with a missile but misses and hits Leland's control panel, which shuts down all the military toys. As Leslie and Patrick confront Leland, Alsatia is attacked by the Sea Swine and is revealed to be a robot, built by Kenneth as a companion for Leslie after the death of his mother. As Leslie and Patrick tend to Alsatia, Leland tries to escape, but the Sea Swine attacks him. As Leland is hospitalized, Leslie takes over the factory and continues his relationship with Gwen, and Alsatia is fully repaired. Owen continues to work at Zevo, and Patrick prepares to depart for other missions, but remains with the others long enough to attend a brief memorial to Kenneth.

Cast
 Robin Williams as Leslie Zevo
 Michael Gambon as Lieutenant General Leland Zevo
 Jack Warden as Old General Zevo
 Joan Cusack as Alsatia Zevo
 Robin Wright as Gwen Tyler
 LL Cool J as Captain Patrick Zevo
 Donald O'Connor as Kenneth Zevo
 Arthur Malet as Owen Owens
 Jamie Foxx as Baker
 Julio Oscar Mechoso as Cortez
 Blake Clark as Hogenstern
 Yeardley Smith as Researcher Miss Drum
 Wendy Melvoin as Choir Soloist
 Debi Mazar as Nurse Debbie

Production
Italian designer Ferdinando Scarfiotti spent over a year designing the sets, which overtook every sound stage at Fox Studios in Los Angeles. The influence of René Magritte's art is obvious in the set design and in some of the costume design. The poster distributed to movie theaters featuring Williams in a red bowler hat against a blue, cloud-lined background evokes The Son of Man. Golconda is featured during a sequence where Williams and Cusack perform in a music video sequence rife with surreal imagery, much of it Magritte-inspired. The film's design was also influenced by Dadaism, Modernism and Italian Futurism—notably the work of Fortunato Depero.

The film has often been noted for many of its outdoor scenes, which feature the Palouse region. All of the outdoor scenes, including the trailer, were filmed on location in southeastern Washington near Rosalia and north-central Idaho.

Soundtrack

The "Into Battle" mix of "Welcome to the Pleasuredome" by Frankie Goes to Hollywood was created for the film by the song's original producer Trevor Horn and is exclusive to the soundtrack album.

Release

Promotion
The film was publicized with a trailer that featured Williams walking through a large undulating field of green grass, breaking the fourth wall and talking to the audience. This trailer was parodied on the TV show The Simpsons in the episode "Burns' Heir", substituting Mr. Burns for Williams.

Box office
Toys was released in 1,272 venues, earning $4,810,027 and ranking sixth in its opening weekend, second among new releases behind Forever Young. The film would ultimately gross $23,278,931 in North America, making it a commercial failure based on a $50 million budget.

Critical response
The film has an approval rating of 29% on Rotten Tomatoes based on 28 reviews, and an average score of 4.5/10. The website's consensus reads, "Like a colorfully overengineered gewgaw on the shelf, Toys might look like fun, but its seemingly limitless possibilities lead mainly to confusion and disappointment." Audiences surveyed by CinemaScore gave the film an average grade of "C+" on an A+ to F scale.

Kenneth Turan of the Los Angeles Times stated that what made the film "that much sadder a failure is that everyone involved must have sincerely felt they were doing the Lord's work, care and concern going hand in hand with an almost total miscalculation of mood. Even Robin Williams, so lively a voice in Aladdin, is on beatific automatic pilot here, preferring to be warm and cuddly when a little of his energy (paradoxically on splendid display in the film's teaser trailer) is desperately called for. The Grinch Who Stole Christmas seems to have stripped the life from this film as well, leaving a pretty shell, expensive but hollow, in its place." Peter Travers wrote in the Rolling Stone: "To cut Toys a minor break, it is ambitious. It is also a gimmicky, obvious and pious bore, not to mention overproduced and overlong."

Home media
The film was released on VHS in 1993 and DVD on October 16, 2001.

Video game
A video game based on the film, Toys: Let the Toy Wars Begin!, was released in 1993 for the Super NES and Genesis platforms by Absolute Entertainment. The game is played from an isometric perspective, and involves the player, as Leslie, attempting to destroy the elephant-head security cameras in the factory, cafeteria and warehouse levels in order to shut down those defenses. Once the player gets to the Manhattan model, the game switches to a side-scrolling flying shoot-'em-up stage, where the player must fly all the way to the General's control center, shut down the production of the war toys, and save the good name of Zevo Toys.

References

External links
 
 
 

1992 films
1990s English-language films
1990s fantasy comedy films
1990s fantasy adventure films
1990s fantasy films
American fantasy adventure films
American fantasy comedy films
American children's fantasy films
Android (robot) films
Drone films
Films scored by Hans Zimmer
Films about dysfunctional families
Films about toys
Films about video games
Films directed by Barry Levinson
Films set in factories
Films set in Idaho
Films shot in Idaho
Films shot in Los Angeles
Films shot in Washington (state)
20th Century Fox films
1992 comedy films
1990s American films